The Altavista petroglyph complex is located near the village and beach-town of Chacala, south of the Compostela Municipality, in Nayarit Mexico.

The area is known as "La Pila del Rey", "Chacalán", "El Santuario", "The Petroglyphs” or "the Altavista petroglyphs", near the Jaltemba Bay, in the Pacific Ocean of Nayarit.

This region was originally home to the largely unstudied Tecoxquin (Tequectequi) native culture dating from approximately 2000 BC to 2300 BCE. It contains 56 petroglyphs whose antiquity cannot be accurately determined. Aside from its cultural and archeological importance, the site remains an important religious center for the Huicholes who still leave offerings and perform ceremonies here.

In prehispanic times, the Compostela municipality area was inhabited by the Mazatán peoples, tributary of Xalisco-Zacualpan Kingdom.

Petroglyphs
The Tecoxquines (Aztec Group) engraved images in volcanic stone over two thousand years ago near Las Piletas. These petroglyphs perhaps were symbolic elements of everyday life, as far as health, fertility, rains, and crops. The rock carvings might have been meant as prayers or offerings to the gods responsible for these things.

There are fifteen signs (Spanish & English posted along entrance path, a brief summary is provided below:

Sign 1 - Altavista
Altavista petroglyphs archaeological site, located along the sides of a creek on the slopes the Copo volcano. Covers an area of approximately 80 hectares, with a large concentration of petroglyphs. (More than 2000 engravings identified)

Sign 2 - The Tecoxquin (Throat-Cutters) 
Original Altavista inhabitants. This native group inhabited a vast region covering the South coast of Nayarit, neighbouring coasts, and mountainous regions of Jalisco, Mexico. They were mainly farmers, fishermen, salt producers and traders of cocoa and cotton. The Tecoxquines were organized in a number of villages under the control of Teuzacualpan Chila Valley (modern city of Zacualpan). Business links allowed them to develop an intensive trade, reached Sinaloa to the north and Colima and Michoacán to the South and East.

Sign 3 - Religious Life (Tecoxquines)
No doubt, many religious ceremonies at this site were based on nahualism. Nahualism or Shamanism as former religious practices whereby people communicated with their gods and spirits during altered states of consciousness. The Tecoxquines used psychotropic plants and tobacco plants to achieve states of ecstasy and communicate with their gods.

Sign 4 - The Last of The Tecoxquines

After the Spanish conquest, the Tecoxquines completely annihilated by epidemics and forced labor. Today native cities of the region still talk about "white Indians," ghosts appearing from the mountains to honor their ancient gods.

Sign 5 – The Tecuales
The Tecoxquin ancient villages, as far as the Ixtapa salt producers, were populated by Tecuales, ancestors of the current Huichol.

Sign 6 - The Water Cycle 
Nayarit State is characterized by heavy rainfall. Rainfall is concentrated between May and October. The Altavista mountains attract heavy rains leaving drier areas to the East (desert weather at the opposite side). Perhaps because of this abundance of water, Altavista was considered a special place.

Sign 7 - Tomoanchan (or Tamoanchan)
Tamoanchan is a mythical paradisiac location known to the Mesoamerican cultures of the central Mexican region in the Late Postclassical period, is a central part of the ancient Mesoamerican cosmology. Tamoanchan is the cosmic tree that connects life and supports the world. Its roots are underground in the water and fertility field. Its trunk is between human beings above ground and heavens. The Crown of the tree is in heaven, the kingdom of gods and rain. Tamoanchan was represented by the Ceiba tree.

Sign 8 - Warfare: Trophy Heads 
The "Guerra Florida " (flower war) was one of the main religious practices associated with the Tecoxquines. The aim was not to conquer. Rather, get warriors prisoners for ritual sacrifice, and whose heads were cut and then offered to the gods. These wars were usually produced locally, but also conducted in places as far away as the Talpa and Mascota Valleys and Mochitiltic Canyon in Jalisco.

Sign 9 – Tlalocan
water was thought to be underground in ancient Mesoamerica, hence the underworld was considered a fertile place. Tlalocan was the "water"paradise underground. It was inhabited by the “Chanes”, or water spirits, as well as the spirits of people drowned or whose death was water related. Tlalocan also was the site of the legendary crocodile Cipactli, a "earth monster", symbolizing fertility.

Sign 10 – The Devoted Christ 
The first historical references of the archaeological site of Altavista date from 1612. These describe many crosses, and above all, a devout Christ that local people venerates. This is possibly a reference to the "corn man", a figure that symbolizes fertility and growth. Local farmers leave offerings of candles and gourd bowls of salt to this figure in order to obtain fertility for their coffee and tobacco crops.

Sign 11 – The Apostle Matthew 
During the early 17TH century, Spaniards believed that the Apostle Matthew traveled to the new world in prehispanic times to evangelize natives. This is thought to explain the crosses engraved in the Altavista rocks.

Sign 12 – The Cross 
For Tecoxquines, as well as for most ancient Mesoamerican, the cross actually was a mental map of the cosmos. Symbolizes five sacred directions: the four cardinal points and the center. Each is associated with certain gods, colors, and sacred kingdoms, as well as each of the four trees that formed the tamoanchan kingdoms. The idea of the universe of four corners is still present among native Mexico today, symbolized by crosses, diamonds and other similar forms.

Sign 13 – Communication With The Gods 
The Altavista rocks were probably associated with the mythical Tamoanchan trees connecting the underworld, earth and heaven. The prayers of the people went up through the sap of the trunks into the realm of the gods. In turn, the gifts of the gods, rain, fertility and good health returned to land the same way. For the Tecoxquines the Altavista rocks would have served the same purpose, a means of communication between the people and their gods.

Sign 14 – Tecoxquin Symbolism 
Spirals, wavy lines, and other symbols carved in the Altavista rocks probably constitute a ritual prayer language for the gods. As an agricultural culture, the Tocoxquines would have been concerned with rain, fertility of the land and the continuity of the seasonal rhythms that they relied on. While the exact meaning of symbols will never be known, spirals have been interpreted as the Sun, storm, the wind, the spiral snake, or as a symbol of the natural cycle of station rainy and dry.

Sign 15 –Huichol Offerings
Huichol natives occasionally visit Altavista originally lived in the Nayar mountains, recently a group moved to the Las Varas area. They present offerings and perform ceremonies for Nakahue, "our fertility grandmother" and Tatevari, "our grandfather of fire". Some Huicholes also travel to the nearby Chacala Port, where ancient petroglyphs are present and leave offerings for Tatei Aramara “our mother Ocean”.

References

Mesoamerican sites
Archaeological sites in Mexico
Archaeological sites in Nayarit
Mesoamerican art
Petroglyphs in Mexico